Sarah Flood-Beaubrun  (born 8 January 1969) is a Saint Lucian lawyer and politician. Beaubrun is the former representative for the constituency of Castries Central in the House of Assembly. Beaubrun lost her seat in the 2021 Saint Lucian General Election dubbed a landslide victory for the Saint Lucia Labour Party.

Education
Flood-Beaubrun who is a mother of two was educated at the Castries Comprehensive Secondary School and Sir Arthur Lewis Community College in St. Lucia and subsequently at the University of Hull where she obtained a Bachelor of Laws (LLB-Hons). She did post-graduate Law at the University of Westminster, leading to a degree of Utter Barrister, and was called to the Bar of England and Wales (1995) and the Bar of the Organization of Eastern Caribbean Supreme Court (1995).

Political career 
She was elected as a Member of Parliament in 1997 to represent the Castries Central constituency, beating the then sitting Prime Minister, and was subsequently re-elected in 2001. The election of Flood-Beaubrun and Menissa Rambally in 1997 and 2001, according to Cynthia Barrow-Giles, "transformed the St Lucia lower House of parliament from a virtual 'all boys camp' to a more gender integrated elected parliament". Flood-Beaubrun served as Minister of Health, Human Services, Family Affairs and Gender Relations in the SLP administration during the first term and during the second term as Minister of Home Affairs and Gender Relations.

Flood-Beaubrun again contested and won the Castries Central seat on the United Workers Party ticket in the 2016 general election. She was elected Deputy Speaker of the House of Assembly on 12 July 2016. Beaubrun would go on to lose her seat in the 2021 Saint Lucian General Election.

Leadership
In her various capacities as a Minister from 1997 to 2004, Flood-Beaubrun oversaw the construction of the first new correctional institution in St. Lucia for over 100 years, the complete upgrading and revamping to international standards of the main intake area of the islands primary medical institution, the establishment of the 1st women’s support center for abused women, the creation of the 1st Mother to Child HIV prevention of transmission program in St. Lucia, plus other programs. Under her focus and leadership she  brought a completely new concentration on the appallingly ignored issue of mental health treatment and incarceration of  the mentally challenged in St. Lucia.  This focus and spotlighting subsequently led to the establishment of a new mental health institution in St. Lucia.

Following the general election in December 2006, Flood-Beaubrun was historically selected as St. Lucia's first female Speaker of the House of Assembly effective 9 January 2007.

Other Office 
Flood-Beaubrun in September 2008 was subsequently appointed Deputy Permanent Representative for St. Lucia at the United Nations in New York and was succeeded in the role of Speaker of the House of Assembly by another woman, Rosemary Husbands-Mathurin.

Advocacy 
Flood-Beaubrun has established a strong reputation in St. Lucia, the Caribbean and internationally as a persuasive defender of human rights and dignity. She has spoken in various Caribbean forum on these issues and their relation to good governance in the region.

References

Living people
1969 births
Speakers of the House of Assembly of Saint Lucia
Alumni of the University of Hull
Alumni of the University of Westminster
Government ministers of Saint Lucia
Interior ministers of Saint Lucia
Health ministers of Saint Lucia
Saint Lucia Labour Party politicians
20th-century Saint Lucian lawyers
Saint Lucian women lawyers
United Workers Party (Saint Lucia) politicians
Women government ministers of Saint Lucia
Female interior ministers
20th-century Saint Lucian women politicians
21st-century Saint Lucian women politicians
21st-century Saint Lucian politicians